The Bad Man may refer to:

 The Bad Man (play), a 1920 play by Porter Emerson Browne, basis for all three films
 The Bad Man (1923 film), an American silent film drama directed by Edwin Carewe
 The Bad Man (1930 film), an American early sound film starring Walter Huston
 The Bad Man (1941 film), an American film starring Wallace Beery and Ronald Reagan

See also
 A Bad Man, a 1967 novel by Stanley Elkin
 Badman (disambiguation)
 Villain (disambiguation)